Joseph Mason "Bull" Reeves (November 20, 1872 – March 25, 1948) was an admiral in the United States Navy and an early and important supporter of U.S. Naval Aviation. Though a battleship officer during his early career, he became known as the "Father of Carrier Aviation" for his role in integrating aircraft carriers into the fleet as a major part of the Navy's attack capabilities.

Reeves retired in the mid-1930s but was recalled to active duty during World War II to serve in high-level staff positions within the Office of the Secretary of the Navy. He retired again in December 1946 with the rank of full admiral.

Early life and career
Joseph Mason Reeves was born on November 20, 1872, in the village of Tampico, Illinois.

He received an appointment in 1890 to attend the United States Naval Academy, where he became a football hero. In addition to his on-field heroics, he is credited with the invention of the modern football helmet, which he had a shoemaker create for him after being told by a Navy doctor that another kick to his head could result in "instant insanity" or death. Reeves graduated from the academy in 1894.

Upon graduation, Reeves was assigned to the cruiser . He served on the battleship  during the Spanish–American War, taking part in the action against Admiral Pascual Cervera y Topete's fleet at Santiago de Cuba in June and July 1898.

Start of the 20th century Through World War I
He served as the academy's head football coach in 1907, guiding the team to a 9–2–1 record and a 6–0 victory over Army.

Following duties as ordnance officer on board the battleship , Reeves served as ordnance officer in the staff of the Commander-in-Chief, U.S. Atlantic Fleet. He followed this with assignment to the Board of Inspection and Survey and a tour as Commanding Officer, Naval Coal Depot, Tiburon, California.

In April 1913, Commander Reeves assumed command of the collier , the Navy's first electrically propelled vessel.

Detached from Jupiter in April 1914, he commanded the cruiser  and various other ships until assigned to the battleship  in June 1915 as Commanding Officer.

Detached for shore duty at the Mare Island Naval Shipyard in California in June 1916, he then commanded the battleship  during World War I, earning the Navy Cross for "exceptionally meritorious service" during that tour.

Post–World War I Assignments
After the war he served as Naval Attaché at Rome and in April 1921 assumed command of the cruiser . Captain of the Mare Island Navy Yard at the end of that year, he afterwards commanded the battleship  in 1922–23, then attended the Naval War College at Newport. After completing his coursework, he spent a year as a member of the staff.

Entering Naval Aviation

Upon completing his tour at the War College, Captain Reeves decided to enter the new world of naval aviation. In order to hold a command post, however, he needed to receive aviation training. Like other older officers—notably, RADM William A. Moffett, Chief of the Navy's new Bureau of Aeronautics—Reeves qualified as a "Naval Aviation Observer" rather than as a "Naval Aviator" (i.e., a pilot). He received his qualification in 1925 and assumed the post of Commander, Aircraft Squadron, Battle Fleet. Though a captain by rank, his position as squadron commander permitted him to fly a commodore's pennant. His flagship was the experimental carrier USS Langley—his old ship, Jupiter, modified for aviation operations. The wooden flight-deck was installed over the Langley's existing deck structures, giving the vessel the nickname of "Covered Wagon."

While in this command, Reeves worked hard to develop carrier aviation tactics, seeking to increase sortie rates and the use of dive-bombing. He proved these concepts by the success of his pilots and aircrew during the Navy's annual fleet exercises (known as "Fleet Problems").

Reeves served on the Navy's General Board, June 1929–June 1930. Fifteen months later he became Senior Member of the Board of Inspection and Survey, Pacific Coast Section. Another tour at Mare Island followed and in June 1933 he became Commander, Battleships, Battle Force, with the rank of vice admiral. In July, he was assigned as Commander, Battle Force, U.S. Fleet, with the rank of admiral.

On February 26, 1934, Admiral Reeves was designated Commander-in-Chief, U.S. Fleet. He held this command until June 1936, when he was ordered to Washington, D.C., to serve on the General Board. He held the Board position until November 23, 1936, and retired seven days later.

Recall during World War II

The admiral's retirement was short-lived, as his nation again needed his services to fight another World War. Reeves was recalled to active duty on May 13, 1940, advanced to vice admiral on the retired list, and was attached to the Office of the Secretary of the Navy. Reeves served simultaneously as Lend-Lease Liaison Officer from March 1941 to December 1945, Senior Military Member of the Munitions Assignments Board and Chairman of the Munitions Assignment Committee (Navy) from 13 February 1942 to 8 November 1945, and Chairman of the Joint Munitions Allocation Committee from 11 January 1944 to 2 September 1945.

In diplomatic relations with the senior military representatives of the United Nations, Admiral Reeves displayed unusual qualities of leadership and rendered invaluable service in carrying out his duties. His skill and initiative in bringing about the harmonious distribution of finished materials to meet the demands of all United Nations Services, were essential to the integration of the Allied military organization, and his brilliant analyses of the overall situation were substantial factors in executing logistic plans in accordance with strategic requirements.

Reeves retired from the Navy as an Admiral in June 1947 and received the Distinguished Service Medal and Legion of Merit for his service. He spent his last years living in Maryland and died at the National Naval Medical Center in Bethesda, Maryland, on March 25, 1948.

Together with his wife Eleanor Watkins Reeves, Reeves had three children.

In popular culture

Reeves was portrayed by Jack Holt in Task Force (film).

Reeves's legacy
A warship and two airfields have been named in honor of Admiral Reeves.
 The guided missile frigate USS Reeves (DLG/CG-24) was commissioned 15 May 1964 and won three battle stars for Vietnam service. The Reeves was reclassified on 30 June 1975 as a guided missile cruiser (CG-24). Reeves was decommissioned and stricken from the Navy Register on 12 November 1993 at Pearl Harbor. She was sunk at sea 31 May 2001 off the coast of Australia.
 Joseph Mason Reeves Field ("Reeves Field") at NAS Lemoore, California, was dedicated November 20, 1961.
 NAS Reeves Field San Pedro in California (later NAS Terminal Island), was dedicated during the 1930s. This airfield is no longer active.

Awards and decorations
Reeves earned the following awards and decorations:

Head coaching record

Notes

References 

Grossnick, Roy et al. United States Naval Aviation 1910–1995. Washington, D.C.: Naval Historical Center, Dept. of the Navy, 1997.
 (Text available online from the Naval Aviation History Office/Branch of the Naval Historical Center)
Wildenberg, Thomas. All the Factors of Victory: Admiral Joseph Mason Reeves and the Origins of Carrier Airpower. Washington, D.C.:

External links

 
 Californians and the Military: Admiral Joseph Mason "Bull" Reeves, USN (1872–1948) By WO1 Mark J. Denger and LTC Norman S. Marshall, California Center for Military History. From the website of the California Military Museum, operated by the California State Military Department.

1872 births
1948 deaths
American military personnel of the Spanish–American War
United States Navy personnel of World War I
United States Navy World War II admirals
United States Navy admirals
United States Naval Academy alumni
Naval War College alumni
Navy Midshipmen football players
United States naval aviation
Burials at the United States Naval Academy Cemetery
Recipients of the Navy Cross (United States)
Recipients of the Navy Distinguished Service Medal
Recipients of the Legion of Merit
Commanders of the Order of Saints Maurice and Lazarus
United States naval attachés
People from Tampico, Illinois